Ambositra  is a city (commune urbaine) in central Madagascar.

Ambositra is the capital of the Amoron'i Mania region, and of Ambositra District.
It is the centre of Madagascar's' wood-carving industry due to the presence of the Zafimaniry tribe, a subgroup of the Betsileo tribe. There are many shops selling wooden boxes, chessboards and figurines.

Infrastructure
It is situated at the RN 7 (Antsirabe - Tulear);

Religion
The Diocese of Ambositra is seated in the town (Cathedral of the Immaculate Heart of Mary), led by Bishop Fidelis Rakotonarivo.

Cities in Madagascar
Populated places in Amoron'i Mania
Regional capitals in Madagascar